Archduchess Maria Theresa of Austria (18 September 1862, in Alt-Bunzlau, Bohemia, Austrian Empire – 10 May 1933, in Żywiec Castle, Żywiec, Poland) was a member of the House of Habsburg-Tuscany and Archduchess of Austria, Princess of Tuscany by birth. Maria Theresia was the eldest child and eldest daughter of Archduke Karl Salvator of Austria and his wife, Princess Maria Immaculata of Bourbon-Two Sicilies.

Marriage and issue
Maria Theresa married her mother's second cousin Archduke Charles Stephen of Austria, fourth child and third son of Archduke Karl Ferdinand of Austria and his wife, Archduchess Elisabeth Franziska of Austria, on 28 February 1886 in Vienna. Maria Theresia and Charles Stephen had six children together:

 Archduchess Eleonora of Austria-Teschen (1886–1974) married morganatically Alfons von Kloss.
 Archduchess Renata of Austria-Teschen (1888–1935) married Prince Hieronymus Radziwill.
 Archduke Karl Albrecht of Austria-Teschen (1888–1951) married morganatically Alice Habsburg.
 Archduchess Mechthildis of Austria-Teschen (1891–1966) married Prince Olgierd Czartoryski.
 Archduke Leo Karl of Austria-Teschen (1893–1939) married Maria-Klothilde von Thuillières Gräfin von Montjoye-Vaufrey et de la Roche, had issue, among others Count Leo Stefan of Habsburg.
 Archduke Wilhelm of Austria-Teschen (1895–1948). Died unmarried.

Honours
 :
 Dame of the Order of the Starry Cross, 1st Class
 Grand Cross of the Order of Elizabeth
 : Dame of the Order of Saint Elizabeth
 : Grand Cordon of the Order of Charity
 : Dame of the Order of Queen Maria Luisa

Ancestry

References

1862 births
1933 deaths
People from Brandýs nad Labem-Stará Boleslav
House of Habsburg-Lorraine
Austrian princesses